The Desert Song is a 1953 film version in Technicolor of Sigmund Romberg's operetta. It is the third film version of the operetta, the third made by Warner Bros., and the second in full three-strip Technicolor. Although it was released in 1953, it was not made in widescreen; at that time Twentieth-Century Fox held the rights to Cinemascope, which was introduced that year in the film The Robe.

Plot
The original plot is more-or-less adhered to, with some significant alterations. Benny is depicted as a comic Bob Hope-like coward, but not as a sissy. El Khobar's alter ego is that of a mild-mannered (but not squeamish) Latin tutor and anthropologist, whom Birabeau (Ray Collins) hires to keep Margot (Kathryn Grayson) from flirting with his regiment.

The conclusion to the film is slightly different, since El Khobar (Gordon MacRae) is not Birabeau's son here. After the final battle, the General's soldiers realize that El Khobar and the Riffs were actually on their side and helped in preventing an uprising. When one asks, "And where is El Khobar?", MacRae, as the professor, enters carrying El Khobar's clothes, and quietly announces "El Khobar is dead". Margot is grief-stricken, but Birabeau, suspecting the truth, mischievously says that they can all be grateful to "the ghost of El Khobar", winking as he says this. As soon as they are alone, MacRae begins to sing the song One Alone to Margot, making her realize that her boring Latin tutor and the dashing El Khobar are one and the same. She rushes into his arms.

One song not by Romberg, Gay Parisienne, written for the 1943 film version of the show, is retained for this film.

Casting
 Kathryn Grayson as Margot
 Gordon MacRae as El Khobar/Paul Bonnard, the dashing outlaw leader 
 Steve Cochran as Captain Claud Fontaine, El Khobar's rival for Margot's affections
 Raymond Massey as Sheik Youseff, the villain
 Dick Wesson as Benjamin 'Benjy' Kidd
 Allyn McLerie as Azuri
 Ray Collins as General Birabeau, here depicted as Margot's father, rather than the hero's
 Paul Picerni as Hassan  
 Frank DeKova as Mindar  
 William Conrad as Lachmed  
 Trevor Bardette as Neri  
 Mark Dana as Lt. Duvalle

Music
The film features about eight numbers from the original score, but all of the songs (unlike those in the stage version), are given to either MacRae or Grayson (or both), or the chorus.

References

External links
 
 
 
 

1953 films
1950s romantic musical films
American romantic musical films
Films based on operettas
Operetta films
Warner Bros. films
French Foreign Legion in popular culture
Films set in deserts
Films set in Morocco
Musical film remakes
Films directed by H. Bruce Humberstone
1950s English-language films
1950s American films